This is the episode list of , the 2020 installment of the long running Ultra Series.

At the end of each episode, a minisode called  aired and featuring Haruki Natsukawa described the Ultra or Monster Medals of said episode.

Episodes 



References 

Z